Laz Bistrički ("Laz of Bistrica") is a village in Croatia. It is connected by the D29 highway.

Populated places in Krapina-Zagorje County